Primator may refer to:

 Primátor, a beer by the Náchod Brewery
 Primator, a minor character from Mighty Morphin Power Rangers
 Primator (train), a train that ran between Prague and Berlin